Cheryl Gray may refer to:

Cheryl A. Gray Evans (born 1968), American politician in the Louisiana Senate
Cheryl Gray (Coronation Street), a character from the British soap opera Coronation Street
Samantha Sang (born 1951), Australian singer who had an earlier career as Cheryl Gray